The Baleng Tower is a tower in Fuxing District, Taoyuan City, Taiwan.

Architecture
The 29.5 meters high tower was constructed in a former fort built during the Japanese rule of Taiwan. It was constructed on an altitude of 1,314 meters above sea level. The structure is equipped with LED lamps that will shine during night time. It was constructed with the Atayal culture and Eiffel Tower architectural style.

See also
 List of tourist attractions in Taiwan

References

2018 establishments in Taiwan
Buildings and structures in Taoyuan City
Towers in Taiwan